This is a list of official football games played by Iran national football team between 1990 and 1999.

1990
Friendly

Friendly

1990 Asian Games – Preliminary Round

1990 Asian Games – Preliminary Round

1990 Asian Games – Quarterfinal

1990 Asian Games – Semifinal

1990 Asian Games – Final

1991
1991 Afro-Asian Cup of Nations

1991 Afro-Asian Cup of Nations

1992
1992 AFC Asian Cup Qualifier

1992 AFC Asian Cup Qualifier

Friendly

Friendly

Friendly

1992 AFC Asian Cup – Preliminary Round

1992 AFC Asian Cup – Preliminary Round

1992 AFC Asian Cup – Preliminary Round

1993
1993 ECO Cup – Preliminary Round

1993 ECO Cup – Preliminary Round

1993 ECO Cup – Semifinal

1993 ECO Cup – Final

1994 FIFA World Cup Qualifier – First Round

1994 FIFA World Cup Qualifier – First Round

1994 FIFA World Cup Qualifier – First Round

1994 FIFA World Cup Qualifier – First Round

1994 FIFA World Cup Qualifier – First Round

1994 FIFA World Cup Qualifier – First Round

1994 FIFA World Cup Qualifier – Final Round

1994 FIFA World Cup Qualifier – Final Round

1994 FIFA World Cup Qualifier – Final Round

1994 FIFA World Cup Qualifier – Final Round

1994 FIFA World Cup Qualifier – Final Round

1994
1994 Asian Games – Preliminary Round

1994 Asian Games – Preliminary Round

1994 Asian Games – Preliminary Round

1994 Asian Games – Preliminary Round

1996
Friendly

Friendly

Friendly

Friendly

Friendly

Friendly

1996 AFC Asian Cup Qualifier

1996 AFC Asian Cup Qualifier

1996 AFC Asian Cup Qualifier

1996 AFC Asian Cup Qualifier

1996 AFC Asian Cup Qualifier

1996 AFC Asian Cup Qualifier

Friendly

Friendly

Friendly

1996 AFC Asian Cup – Preliminary Round

1996 AFC Asian Cup – Preliminary Round

1996 AFC Asian Cup – Preliminary Round

1996 AFC Asian Cup – Quarterfinal

1996 AFC Asian Cup – Semifinal

1996 AFC Asian Cup – 3rd Place Match

1997
Friendly

Friendly

Friendly

1998 FIFA World Cup Qualifier – First Round

1998 FIFA World Cup Qualifier – First Round

1998 FIFA World Cup Qualifier – First Round

1998 FIFA World Cup Qualifier – First Round

1998 FIFA World Cup Qualifier – First Round

1998 FIFA World Cup Qualifier – First Round

Friendly

Friendly

1998 FIFA World Cup Qualifier – Second Round

1998 FIFA World Cup Qualifier – Second Round

1998 FIFA World Cup Qualifier – Second Round

1998 FIFA World Cup Qualifier – Second Round

1998 FIFA World Cup Qualifier – Second Round

1998 FIFA World Cup Qualifier – Second Round

1998 FIFA World Cup Qualifier – Second Round

1998 FIFA World Cup Qualifier – Second Round

1998 FIFA World Cup Qualifier – Third Round

1998 FIFA World Cup Qualifier – Play-off AFC/OFC

1998 FIFA World Cup Qualifier – Play-off AFC/OFC

1998
1998 Lunar New Year Cup – Semifinal

1998 Lunar New Year Cup – 3rd Place Match

Friendly

1998 LG Cup – Semifinal

1998 LG Cup – 3rd Place Match

Friendly

1998 FIFA World Cup – Preliminary Round

1998 FIFA World Cup – Preliminary Round

1998 FIFA World Cup – Preliminary Round

Friendly

1998 Asian Games – Preliminary Round

1998 Asian Games – Preliminary Round

1998 Asian Games – Second Round

1998 Asian Games – Second Round

1998 Asian Games – Second Round

1998 Asian Games – Quarterfinal

1998 Asian Games – Semifinal

1998 Asian Games – Final

1999
1999 Ciao February Cup – Semifinal

1999 Canada Cup

1999 Canada Cup

1999 Canada Cup

1999 Kirin World Challenge

Friendly

Statistics

Results by year

Managers

Opponents

External links
 www.teammelli.com
 www.fifa.com

1990s in Iranian sport
1990
1989–90 in Iranian football
1990–91 in Iranian football
1991–92 in Iranian football
1992–93 in Iranian football
1993–94 in Iranian football
1994–95 in Iranian football
1995–96 in Iranian football
1996–97 in Iranian football
1997–98 in Iranian football
1998–99 in Iranian football
1999–2000 in Iranian football